Pat Evans may refer to:

Pat Evans (gymnast) (1926–2020), British Olympic gymnast
Pat Evans (mayor) (born 1943), mayor of Plano, Texas, 2002–2009
Pat Evans (motorcyclist) (1955–1977), American motorcycle racer
Pat Evans (Louisiana), in the Louisiana Center for Women and Government Hall of Fame
Pat Evans, American TV news anchor on KARE, Minneapolis, Minnesota
Pat Evans (EastEnders), a fictional character

See also
Patrick Evans (disambiguation)
Patricia Evans (disambiguation)